Susan Egelstaff (born 12 October 1982; née Hughes) is a Scottish badminton player. Egelstaff won team bronze at the 2002 Commonwealth Games in Manchester, took women's singles bronze four years later in Melbourne, and finished fourth in the singles in Delhi. In 2012, she competed for Great Britain at the 2012 Summer Olympics. She failed to progress past the group stage, beating Maja Tvrdy but losing to the 12th seed Sayaka Sato in three games.

Achievements

Commonwealth Games 
Women's singles

BWF International Challenge/Series 
Women's singles

Women's doubles

 BWF International Challenge tournament
 BWF International Series tournament

References

External links 
 
 

Scottish female badminton players
1982 births
Living people
Sportspeople from Glasgow
Badminton players at the 2012 Summer Olympics
Olympic badminton players of Great Britain
Badminton players at the 2010 Commonwealth Games
Badminton players at the 2006 Commonwealth Games
Badminton players at the 2002 Commonwealth Games
Commonwealth Games medallists in badminton
Commonwealth Games bronze medallists for Scotland
Medallists at the 2002 Commonwealth Games
Medallists at the 2006 Commonwealth Games